Major League Baseball (MLB) and the MLB Players Association (MLBPA) announced the creation of a domestic violence policy in August 2015. Officially, the domestic violence policy is included within the broader Joint Domestic Violence, Sexual Assault and Child Abuse Policy. According to the policy, the Commissioner can place any player suspected of domestic violence, sexual assault, or child abuse on administrative leave for up to seven days while conducting an investigation. The Commissioner can choose to suspend or reinstate the player, or can defer judgment until after criminal proceedings conclude. The policy does not include minimum or maximum punishments.

Under baseball's collectively bargained policy, players undergo mandatory domestic violence training once a year in spring training. MLB conscripted a San Francisco-based nonprofit, Futures Without Violence, to spearhead its training program. The nonprofit is also part of MLB’s joint committee on domestic violence, a collaboration between the players’ union and the commissioner’s office.

Prior to MLB's 2015 policy on domestic violence, no club took disciplinary action against a player accused of or arrested for domestic violence until the Boston Red Sox suspended Wil Cordero in 1997 following a domestic violence arrest. In March 2016, the league suspended Aroldis Chapman for 30 games following an alleged incident between Chapman and his girlfriend. He was the first player suspended by the league following the implementation of the league-wide policy.

List of players suspended

See also

List of Major League Baseball players suspended for performance-enhancing drugs
List of suspensions in the National Football League
List of people banned or suspended by the NBA
List of people banned from Major League Baseball

References

Domestic violence
Players suspended for domestic violence
Domestic violence, suspensions
Domestic violence